Carno is a village in Powys, Wales. The community, which is also a parish in the historic county of  Montgomeryshire, comprises the townships of Derlwyn, Llysyn, and Trowscoed. It is in the geographical centre of Wales.

Geography
The Afon Carno rises near the watershed with the Afon Dyfi; and runs 9 miles south-eastward to the River Severn, 2¼ miles north of Llandinam. The village's name is supposedly derived from the Welsh language word for cairn (carnedd), as there are many ancient cairns on the hills surrounding the village.  The A470 road between Llanbrynmair and Caersws passes through the village. This part of the route follows the course of the Afon Carno through hilly country.
An electoral ward which includes the nearby village of Caersws had a population of 2316 in 2011.

History

A Roman Fort named Gaer Noddfa is located next to the churchyard on the bank of the Afon Carno. A large mound occupies part of the fort; pottery found nearby indicate medieval usage but suggestions that it was a Norman fortification like a motte have been rejected.

In 952, Iago and Ieuaf, the two exiled sons of Idwal Foel, King of Gwynedd, invaded Dyfed. But they were defeated in a decisive battle near Carno by the sons of Hywel Dda, King of Deheubarth. The victory secured the sovereignty of North Wales.

A Grade II* 16th century timber-framed house, Plasau Duon, is near the village.

The Manor House Plas Llysyn was a property raided as an LSD factory as part of Operation Julie. Plas Llysyn was under surveillance and the well that supplied the house was destroyed to investigate the contents. £500,000,000 of LSD was manufactured in the cellars here, supplying 50% of the world's LSD at the time.

Transport

Rail

The original  station was opened by the Newtown and Machynlleth Railway in 1863. It was closed, along with a number of stations on the Cambrian Line, as part of the Ministry of Transport's instigated Beeching cuts in the 1960s. In 2002 a campaign began to reopen a station near the village. In 2009 the Welsh Assembly agreed to examine the proposal as part of the Cambrian Rail Study.

In 2014, the Welsh Assembly confirmed Arriva Trains Wales and Network Rail broadly agreed with an independent report recommending the reopening of a station at Carno. However, a new station would need to be built as the original Victorian building (which was incorporated into the former Laura Ashley factory) is in private ownership.

Notable people
The designer and entrepreneur Laura Ashley (1925–1985) is buried in the churchyard. Bernard and Laura Ashley moved from Kent to Carno in 1961. The company's original factory was in the village, adjoining the station building; it closed in 2005.
The parents of Chicago Outfit gangster Morris Llewellyn Humphreys, (Bryan Humphreys and Ann Wigley), emigrated to the United States from the village in the late 19th century. Dafydd Wigley is his third cousin.

References

External links
 Photos of Carno and surrounding area on geograph.org.uk
 Carno Station Action Group

Communities in Powys
Montgomeryshire
Historic Montgomeryshire Parishes